Cornelis van Dalen (14 March 1885 – 22 May 1953) was a Dutch sports shooter. He competed in six events at the 1920 Summer Olympics.

References

External links
 

1885 births
1953 deaths
Dutch male sport shooters
Olympic shooters of the Netherlands
Van Dalen, Cornelis
People from Monster
Sportspeople from South Holland